The Independent Living Program is a United States Department of Veterans Affairs (VA) Vocational Rehabilitation and Employment (VR&E) program aimed at making sure that each eligible veteran is able to live independently to their maximum capacity.  The program is commonly referred to as VA ILP.  The program is a two-year program that can be extended up to 28 months.  There is an enrollment cap of 2700 participants per year.  VA ILP may include the following services:

 assistive technology specialized medical, health, and / or rehabilitation services
 services to address any personal and / or family adjustment issues
 independent living skills training connection with community-based support services
 individualized equipment to assist with possible employment, volunteer opportunities or to decrease social isolation
 animals to assist with coping or independent movement
 attendant care during the period of transition
 transportation when special arrangements are needed
 peer counseling
 training to improve awareness of rights and needs

Who Qualifies
In order to qualify for the ILP a veteran must meet the following criteria:
 Be eligible to enroll for VR&E services
 Have service-connected disabilities that inhibit the ability to pursue an employment goal
 Have a Vocational Rehabilitation Counselor (VRC) determine that employment goals are not currently feasible

It is noteworthy to mention that enrollment into ILP does NOT affect any benefits the veteran is receiving from VA or the Social Security Administration.
Enrollment is limited to 2,700 eligible veterans annually.

Process
Once the veteran has been identified as qualifying for the ILP, an evaluation of the veteran's independent living needs will be conducted.  The VRC assigns a VA consultant to conduct an Assessment of Needs at the home of the veteran.  The Assessment of Needs is used by the VRC to create an Individualized Independent Living Plan (IILP).  Based on the amount required to fulfill the IILP, the IILP is either approved at the Local (up to $25,000), Regional ($25,000 to $75,000), or Central/D.C. (over $75,000) level.  Upon approval, the plan is implemented.

Individualized Independent Living Plan
The IILP, as mentioned above, is created by the VRC with input from the VA consultant.  Care is taken to ensure the IILP is consistent with the principles and goals of the Veterans Affairs Administration.  The philosophical framework for the IILP is composed of the following nine principles.

1. Enhance participation in activities of daily living (ADL)
2. Assist the veteran in participating to the maximum extent possible and desirable in family and community life
3. Provide the most effective services and assistive technology based on sound research evidence
4. Provide required holistic evaluation and services for all veterans who qualify
5. Develop rehabilitation plans that provide services to address all identified independent living needs
6. Consider the veteran's expressed interests and desires, but provide services based on objectively identified needs
7. Establish goals and measure/verify outcomes
8. Provide services that produce a sustaining influence that continues after rehabilitation services are completed, and
9. Explore the possibility of paid or volunteer employment, when feasible

References
 July 10, 2008 Hearing on ILP - House Committee on Veterans' Affairs
Veterans Affairs Official ILP site
Guidelines for the Administration of an Independent Living Plan

http://www.asknod.org

United States Department of Veterans Affairs
Vocational rehabilitation